Pam Eyking (née Cullen; born 1962)  is a Canadian politician, who was elected to the Nova Scotia House of Assembly in the 2013 provincial election. A member of the Nova Scotia Liberal Party, she represented the electoral district of Victoria-The Lakes.

She is married to Mark Eyking, the former federal Member of Parliament for Sydney—Victoria, who represented the riding from 2000-2019.

In the 2017 election, Eyking was defeated by former MLA Keith Bain.

Electoral record

|-
 
|Liberal Party of Nova Scotia
|Pam Eyking
|align="right"| 3,150
|align="right"| 38.99
|align="right"|
|-

|Progressive Conservative
|Keith Bain
|align="right"| 2,847
|align="right"| 35.24
|align="right"|
|-

|New Democratic Party
| John Frank Tomey
|align="right"| 1,907
|align="right"| 23.60
|align="right"|
|-

| Independent 
| Stewart M. (Stemer) MacLeod
|align="right"| 176
|align="right"| 2.18
|align="right"|
|}

References

1962 births
Living people
Nova Scotia Liberal Party MLAs
People from the Cape Breton Regional Municipality
Women MLAs in Nova Scotia
21st-century Canadian politicians
21st-century Canadian women politicians